Stadium Perica-Pero Pavlović is a multi-use stadium in Gabela, Bosnia and Herzegovina. It is the home ground of First League of FBiH club NK GOŠK Gabela. The stadium has a capacity to hold 3,000 seated spectators.

In December 2016, the stadium was renamed from Stadium Podavala to Stadium Perica-Pero Pavlović.

References

External links
Stadion Perica-Pero Pavlović at Football-Lineups.com

NK GOŠK Gabela
p
Multi-purpose stadiums in Bosnia and Herzegovina